Torger Christian "Toto" Wolff (born 12 January 1972) is an Austrian billionaire motorsport executive, investor, and former racing driver. He holds a 33% stake in the Mercedes-AMG Petronas F1 Team and is Team Principal and CEO of the team.

Wolff began his motorsport career in the Austrian Formula Ford Championship and the German Formula Ford Series. He won his category in the 1994 24 Hours Nürburgring and later competed in the FIA GT Championship and Italian GT Championship. As an investor, Wolff founded Marchfifteen in 1998 and Marchsixteen Investments in 2004, initially focusing on Internet and technology companies. He specialises in strategic investments in medium-sized industrial and listed companies, which have included Williams F1 and German HWA AG.

Early life 
Wolff was born on 12 January 1972 in Vienna to a Polish mother and a Romanian father. His mother was a physician. Of Jewish heritage, he was baptised Catholic. He grew up in the city and was educated in the Lycee Français de Vienne, a prestigious French school. Wolff's father was diagnosed with brain cancer when he was eight years old. His parents separated following his father's diagnosis. His father died of the disease when Wolff was 15.

Motorsport 
Wolff started his motorsport career in 1992 in the Austrian Formula Ford Championship, driving in Austrian and German Formula Ford in 1993 and 1994. In 1994, he won the 24 Hours Nürburgring in his category. In 2002 Wolff finished in sixth place in the N-GT category in the FIA GT Championship and won one race. He switched to the Italian GT Championship in 2003, winning a race in 2004 with Lorenzo Case, while also teaming with Karl Wendlinger in the FIA GT Championship. Wolff was runner up in the Austrian Rally Championship in 2006, and winner of the 2006 Dubai 24 Hour. Wolff has also served as an instructor at the Walter Lechner Racing School and in 2009 became a lap-record holder on the Nürburgring Nordschleife in a Porsche RSR. Wolff also has overall responsibility for the Mercedes EQ Formula E Team.

Formula One 
In 2009, Wolff bought a share of the Williams Formula One Team and joined the board of directors. In 2012, he was named executive director of Williams F1 and the team took its last race win to date at that year's Spanish Grand Prix with Pastor Maldonado.

In January 2013, Wolff left Williams F1 to become an executive director of the Mercedes AMG Petronas Formula One Team, with his business partner Rene Berger becoming non-executive director. In addition to joining the team as managing partner, he also acquired 30% of Mercedes-Benz Grand Prix Ltd, with a further 10% held by Niki Lauda and 60% by the parent company.

Wolff took over the coordination of all Mercedes-Benz motorsport activities, a responsibility previously held by Norbert Haug. In 2014, Wolff sold two-thirds of his Williams shares to American businessman Brad Hollinger. On 9 March 2016, Wolff sold his remaining shares in the Williams team.

As co-owner of both Williams F1 (where wife Susie worked as a test driver until November 2015) and Mercedes Grand Prix, Wolff celebrated numerous podiums and successes for both teams, such as a 1–2–3–4 finish at Spielberg, Austria in his 'home race', as well as at Monza, Italy, in both Qualifying and Race classifications.

In 2020, Mercedes won its record seventh consecutive double world championship. The record was previously held by Ferrari when it won five consecutive double world championships between 2000 and 2004. Mercedes also holds the record of seven consecutive Driver's Championships from 2014 to 2020. Ferrari also previously held this record with five titles from 2000 to 2004. In 2020, Mercedes' record of seven consecutive Constructor's Championships surpassed that of Ferrari's six consecutive Constructor's Championships set between 1999 and 2004. Wolff's achievements were recognised through the presentation of a John Bolster Award from Todt at the 2018 Autosport Awards. Wolff subsequently received the President's Award from Todt, along with team non-executive chairman Niki Lauda, at the 2018 FIA Prize Giving Gala held in St Petersburg, Russia.

2018 proved the most successful motorsport year in the history of Mercedes-Benz. The company won both F1 titles, F2 with George Russell, European F3 with Mick Schumacher, all three titles in its final season of DTM competition with Gary Paffett securing the drivers' title, both F1 eSports titles and numerous championships in customer racing.

For 2019, Mercedes continued its success by securing a sixth consecutive double world championship at the Japanese GP, when the team secured the Constructors' title and only one of Lewis Hamilton and Valtteri Bottas could still become Drivers' champion. This is an unprecedented achievement in the history of the sport. As of 2019, Wolff is the only Team Principal who has won more than five consecutive double world championships.

In 2020, Mercedes secured a seventh consecutive double world championship. The championship set an all-time record of consecutive constructors' championships, ahead of the six Ferrari achieved from 1999 to 2004. In the same season, Hamilton became the most successful driver in terms of race wins at the 2020 Portuguese GP and secured a seventh world drivers' championship at the Turkish GP to tie the record held by Michael Schumacher. The team followed up the achievement with an eighth consecutive constructors' world championship in 2021, whilst finishing second in the drivers'.

Since the introduction of the turbo-hybrid regulations in 2014, Mercedes has won 112 of 184 races under Wolff's leadership. The team has taken 119 of 184 pole positions, 74 front-row lockouts, and 249 from 368 possible podium finishes.

After the 2020 F1 season, Wolff signed a new deal with Mercedes to continue as team principal and CEO for at least another three years.

As of 2021, Wolff's net worth is estimated at CHF 1.25 billion (2021).

Other ventures
Wolff founded investment companies Marchfifteen (1998) and Marchsixteen (2004), which initially focused on internet and technology company investments. Since 2003, Wolff has concentrated on strategic investments in medium-sized industrial and listed companies. Investments included the German HWA AG, in which Wolff bought a 49% stake in 2006 listing the company on the stock exchange in 2007. The company ran the Deutsche Tourenwagen Masters race program for Mercedes-Benz, developing F3 engines and the Gullwing Mercedes-Benz SLS AMG GT3 racing car.

Other investments included BRR Rallye Racing, one of the largest rally parts dealers in Europe. Wolff is also co-owner of a sports management company with former F1 driver Mika Häkkinen and was involved in the management of racing drivers such as Bruno Spengler, Alexandre Prémat and Valtteri Bottas. In April 2020, Wolff acquired a 4.95% stake in Aston Martin Lagonda Global Holdings plc as a financial investment, which subsequently diluted to less than 1%. Wolff's partnership and operational role with Mercedes were unaffected by this transaction. In June 2020, Wolff held a 5% stake in Williams F1 which was sold in the purchase of Williams by Dorilton Capital.
In August 2021, it was incorrectly speculated by tabloid Le Journal de Montréal that Toto Wolff and Aston Martin F1 boss Lawrence Stroll were involved in insider trading with respect to Aston Martin shares, something Wolff contradicted in comments provided to the same newspaper. This allegation was proven to be unfounded following confirmation from respectively the BaFin in Germany and the FCA in the UK that they had found no evidence of wrongdoing.

Wolff was also Director and CEO of the Mercedes-EQ Formula E Team and occasionally attended Formula E races. In August 2021, Wolff was present in Berlin as Mercedes won both the drivers' and teams' championships in Formula E, at a race won by Venturi driver Norman Nato, where wife, Susie Wolff, became the first female team principal to stand on the podium at a world championship motor race. With Venturi driver Edo Mortara finishing second in the drivers' championships, the Wolffs led their respective teams to first and second positions in the Formula E drivers' championship.

Wolff is vice-chairman of the Mary Bendet Foundation, founded in memory of a school friend who was a role model for a generation of friends. The Foundation aims to improve the quality of life for underprivileged children.

Academic work

Wolff was awarded an Honorary Doctorate from Cranfield University for his services to Motorsport in May 2021.

In November 2021, Wolff was appointed to an Associate Fellowship of the Oxford Saïd Business School for two years to transfer his understanding of high-performance culture, team leadership, and personal effectiveness from the racetracks into the classroom.

In February 2022, Wolff’s leadership of the Mercedes-AMG Petronas F1 Team was the subject of a Harvard Business School case study, authored by Anita Elberse. Wolff visited Harvard on 3 March 2022 to teach the case study to MBA students and lead a discussion on high-performance leadership and organisational culture.

"It's really difficult to find a team that has won what is effectively a world championship eight times in a row. Usually complacency sets in, or some other factor makes it impossible for the team to perform at the highest level. We tend to see very short life cycles for teams, but Wolff has kept his team at the top for eight years now. I find that really fascinating," said Elberse.

Personal life
Wolff is married to Susie Wolff, a former racecar driver and current managing director of F1 Academy. He proposed to her on a boat in Venice. They married in October 2011, and live in Monaco. On 10 April 2017, Susie gave birth to their only child together. Wolff has two other children from a previous marriage. Wolff is fluent in German, English, French, Italian, and Polish.

References

External links

1972 births
Living people
Businesspeople from Vienna
Sportspeople from Vienna
Austrian racing drivers
Formula Ford drivers
FIA GT Championship drivers
Austrian investors
Austrian motorsport people
Austrian people of Romanian descent
Austrian people of Polish descent
Motorsport agents
Austrian sports agents
Formula One team owners
Formula One team principals
Porsche Supercup drivers
Austrian expatriate sportspeople in Switzerland
24 Hours of Spa drivers
Mercedes-Benz in Formula One
Walter Lechner Racing drivers
24H Series drivers